The 17th Alberta Legislative Assembly was in session from March 2, 1972, to February 14, 1975, with the membership of the assembly determined by the results of the 1971 Alberta general election held on August 30, 1971. The Legislature officially resumed on March 2, 1972, and continued until the fourth session was prorogued and dissolved on February 14, 1975, prior to the 1975 Alberta general election.

Alberta's seventeenth government was controlled by the majority Progressive Conservative Association of Alberta for the first time, led by Premier Peter Lougheed. The Official Opposition was led by former Premier Harry Strom of the Social Credit Party, and subsequently James Douglas Henderson and Robert Curtis Clark.  The Speaker was Gerard Amerongen who would serve in the role until he was defeated in the 1986 Alberta general election.

Fourth session
Energy policy came to the forefront near the end of the fourth session of the Legislature when on January 16 a joint press conference was held by the owners of Syncrude Canada Ltd., a joint venture company created to extract oil from the Athabasca oil sands seeking $1-billion in investment following the withdrawal of Atlantic Richfield or risk the failure of the venture. Debate over the proposed investment Alberta's news with proponents noting the high costs of development, necessity for domestic oil supplies during the recent 1973 oil crisis, and the risk of stalling future development in the oil sands, while opponents felt the ultimatum was tantamount to blackmail. All provincial governments were provided the opportunity to invest in the agreement, and on February 3 the Governments of Ontario, Canada and Alberta met with Shell Oil and the original partners in the consortium. The Winnipeg Agreement was announced the next day, where the Government of Canada would invest $300-million for 15 per cent of Syncrude Canada Ltd., and the Government of Ontario would invest $100-million for 5 per cent equity, and Alberta would invest $200-million for convertible debenture and finance a $200-million power plant for the site. Representatives from Shell Oil stormed out of the meeting after an hour after the concession for a government-guaranteed base price for oil sands production was not provided. Liberal leader Nick Taylor and NDP leader Grant Notley were very critical of the agreement.

Party standings after the 17th General Election

 A party requires four seats to have official party status in the legislature. Parties with fewer than four seats are not entitled to party funding although their members will usually be permitted to sit together in the chamber.

Members elected
For complete electoral history, see individual districts.

References

Further reading

External links
Alberta Legislative Assembly
Legislative Assembly of Alberta Members Book
By-elections 1905 to present

17